Brushback may refer to:

 Brushback pitch, a baseball pitch thrown high and inside, to force the batter away from the plate
 Brushback (novel), a 1998 crime novel by the American writer K.C. Constantine